William Richard Maximilian Hugo Threlfall (25 June 1888, in Dresden – 4 April 1949, in Oberwolfach) was a British-born German mathematician who worked on algebraic topology. He was a coauthor of the standard textbook Lehrbuch der Topologie.

In 1933 he signed the Vow of allegiance of the Professors of the German Universities and High-Schools to Adolf Hitler and the National Socialistic State.

Publications

Seifert, Threlfall: Lehrbuch der Topologie, Teubner 1934
Seifert, Threlfall: Variationsrechnung im Großen, Teubner 1938

See also
Möbius–Kantor graph
Schwarz triangle tessellation

References
 Gabriele Dörflinger: William R. M. H. Threlfall

1888 births
1949 deaths
20th-century German mathematicians
Topologists